Diurnea lipsiella is a moth of the subfamily Chimabachinae. It is found in Europe.

The wingspan is 17–23 mm. Meyrick describes it - Male 21-25 mm. The antennae with long fasciculate ciliations. Forewings are  light ochreous-brown ; sometimes a whitish sprinkling towards middle of costa and in disc beyond middle ; stigmata very obscurely darker, second discal
lying on an indistinct oblique darker shade from 3/5 of costa to tornus. Hindwings grey.
Female 17-19 mm. Forewings grey-whitish, irroratcd with dark grey ; stigmata and oblique marks before middle and above tornus blackish, sometimes partly connected.The larva is yellow - whitish ; liead dark brown; plate of 2 brown freckled; 3rd pair of legs placed on a shining tubercle (in male only ?).

The moth flies in one generation from October to December depending on the location.

The larvae feed on various deciduous trees and shrubs, such as Rubus, apple, Prunus, Vaccinium and oak.

References

External links
 waarneming.nl 
 Lepidoptera of Belgium
 Diurnea lipsiella at UKmoths
 

Oecophoridae
Moths described in 1775
Moths of Europe
Taxa named by Michael Denis
Taxa named by Ignaz Schiffermüller